Carlos Adolfo Lehnebach is a New Zealand botanist. He is employed as a botany curator at the Museum of New Zealand Te Papa Tongarewa. Lehnebach studies New Zealand orchids. As of January 2018, he has described seven new species of orchid and two species of forget-me-not (Myosotis) indigenous to New Zealand.

Career

Carlos Lehnebach has described multiple new plant species in the Orchidaceae and Boraginaceae. These include the following:

Myosotis (Boraginaceae)

 Myosotis chaffeyorum Lehnebach
 Myosotis mooreana Lehnebach

Corybas (Orchidaceae)

 Corybas confusus Lehnebach
 Corybas obscurus Lehnebach
 Corybas sanctigeorgianus Lehnebach
 Corybas vitreus Lehnebach
 Corybas walliae Lehnebach

Gastrodia (Orchidaceae)

 Gastrodia cooperae Lehnebach & J.R.Rolfe
 Gastrodia molloyi Lehnebach & J.R.Rolfe

Publications

References

External links 
 
  Lehnebach interviewed on RNZ  Our Changing World, 1 December 2016

21st-century New Zealand botanists
Living people
Orchidologists
1974 births